Tom Banks (born 18 June 1994) is an Australian professional rugby player who currently plays for the  in the Super Rugby. He has represented Australia in international rugby. Banks started his Super Rugby career with the Queensland Reds in 2015. His preferred position is fullback or wing.

Early years
Thomas Banks was born in Brisbane, Queensland. He attended school at Brisbane Boys' College during which time he represented Queensland at schoolboy rugby in 2011 and 2012. He moved on to play for the University of Queensland in the Queensland Premier Rugby competition from 2013.

Rugby career

Banks missed out on selection for the Reds 2016 Super Rugby squad.

Banks signed a one-year Super Rugby deal with the Brumbies for the 2017 season. After impressing in his first season of play for the Brumbies, Banks was called up to join the Australia national team squad later that year to replace the injured Dane Haylett-Petty. He was also selected by former Grand Slam-winning coach Alan Jones in the Barbarians squad to play the Wallabies at Allianz Stadium in late October 2017.

Super Rugby statistics

References

1994 births
Living people
Australia international rugby union players
Australian rugby union players
Rugby union fullbacks
Rugby union wings
Queensland Country (NRC team) players
Queensland Reds players
ACT Brumbies players
Canberra Vikings players
People educated at Brisbane Boys' College
Rugby union players from Brisbane
Mie Honda Heat players